was a vice admiral in the Imperial Japanese Navy, noted for his role in the Siemens scandal.

Biography
Matsumoto was born in Edo (now Tokyo) as the younger son of a direct retainer of the Tokugawa shogunate. He graduated in 1880 from the 7th class of the Imperial Japanese Naval Academy, ranked 19 out of 30 cadets. Promoted to lieutenant in 1886, he graduated from the first class of the Naval Staff College in 1888. He was the chief navigator on the cruiser  in 1891–1892 on its year-long voyage to France.

Matsumoto then served in various postings within the Imperial Japanese Navy General Staff after his return to Japan in May 1892, and on the staff of the Readiness Fleet.  During the First Sino-Japanese War he was in charge of coordinating transportation for Imperial Japanese Army units and supplies to the Asian continent, winning much praise for his abilities.  Although not in a combat command, he was awarded the Order of the Golden Kite, 4th class.

He was promoted to captain three months later. He became commanding officer of Itsukushima in October 1903, and was given command of the battleship  in September 1903.

During the Russo-Japanese War, Matsumoto participated at the Battle of Port Arthur and the Battle of the Yellow Sea. He was captain during the Battle of Tsushima, during which Fuji sank the Russian battleship . After the end of the war, Matsumoto was promoted to rear admiral and became commandant of Yokosuka Naval Arsenal in November 1906 and director of Naval Shipbuilding Command from October 1908. He was promoted to vice admiral in December 1909 and commander of Kure Naval District from December 1913. Matsumoto was widely regarded as the future Naval Minister. He was found guilty at a court-martial in May 1914, stripped of his rank and honors, fined 409,800 Yen and sentenced to three years in prison. After his release, he lived the rest of his life in obscurity.

References

Sources

External links
 

1862 births
1927 deaths
Imperial Japanese Navy admirals
Japanese military personnel of the First Sino-Japanese War
Japanese military personnel of the Russo-Japanese War
People of Meiji-period Japan